Defective distribution is the situation where a phoneme in a certain language does not occur in all contexts.

Examples

In German, the phoneme /h/ only occurs at the beginning and in the middle of a word, but not at the end.

In Italian, the phoneme /z/ does not occur morpheme- or word–initially.

See also 
 Contrastive distribution
 Complementary distribution

References 
T Alan Hall: Phonologische Grundbegriffe. (https://home.uni-leipzig.de/schrinner/files/seminar/hall2.pdf)
Pier Marco Bertinetto, Michele Loporcaro: The sound pattern of Standard Italian, as compared with the varieties spoken in Florence, Milan and Rome

Phonology